An election was held on November 6, 2018 to elect all 120 members to North Carolina's House of Representatives. The election coincided with the elections for other offices, including U.S. House of Representatives and state senate. The primary election was held on May 8, 2018 with a run-off on June 26, 2018.

Republicans retained control of the House, despite losing the popular vote, but lost their three-fifths supermajority after a net loss of nine seats (compared to the results of the 2016 elections), winning 65 seats compared to 55 seats for the Democrats.

Results Summary

Statewide

Incumbents defeated in primary election
Beverly Boswell (R-District 6), defeated by Bobby Hanig (R)
Duane Hall (D-District 11), defeated by Allison Dahle (D)
Justin Burr (R-District 67), defeated by Wayne Sasser (R)
Rodney W. Moore (D-District 99), defeated by Nasif Majeed (D)

Incumbents defeated in general election

Democrats
Bobbie Richardson (D-District 7), defeated by Lisa Stone Barnes (R)
George Graham (D-District 12), defeated by Chris Humphrey (R)

Republicans
Chris Malone (R-District 35), defeated by Terence Everitt (D)
Nelson Dollar (R-District 36), defeated by Julie von Haefen (D)
John Adcock (R-District 37), defeated by Sydney Batch (D)
Jonathan C. Jordan (R-District 93), defeated by Ray Russell (D)
John Bradford (R-District 98), defeated by Christy Clark (D)
Bill Brawley (R-District 103), defeated by Rachel Hunt (D)
Andy Dulin (R-District 104), defeated by Brandon Lofton (D)
Scott Stone (R-District 105), defeated by Wesley Harris (D)
Mike Clampitt (R-District 119), defeated by Joe Sam Queen (D)

Open seats that changed parties
Susan Martin (R-District 8) didn't seek re-election, seat won by Kandie Smith (D) 
Jeff Collins (R-District 25) didn't seek re-election, seat won by James Gailliard (D)

Detailed Results

District 1
Incumbent Republican Bob Steinburg has represented the 1st District since 2013. Steinburg retired to run for the 1st district in the NC Senate. Republican Ed Goodwin won the open seat.

District 2
Incumbent Republican Larry Yarborough has represented the 2nd district since 2015.

District 3
Incumbent Republican Michael Speciale has represented the 3rd district since 2013.

District 4
Incumbent Republican Jimmy Dixon has represented the 4th district since 2011.

District 5
Incumbent Democratic Howard Hunter III has represented the 5th district since 2015.

District 6
Incumbent Republican Beverly Boswell lost the Republican primary to Bobby Hanig. Hanig won the general election.

District 7
Incumbent Democrat Bobbie Richardson has represented the 7th district since 2013. Richardson was defeated for re-election by Republican Lisa Stone Barnes.

District 8
Incumbent Republican Susan Martin has represented the 8th district since 2013. Martin did not seek re-election. Democrat Kandie Smith won the open seat.

District 9
Incumbent Republican Greg Murphy has represented the 9th district since 2015.

District 10
Incumbent Republican Majority Leader John Bell has represented the 10th district since 2013.

District 11
Incumbent Democrat Duane Hall has represented the 11th district since 2013. Hall lost re-nomination to fellow Democrat Allison Dahle.  Dahle won the open seat.

District 12
Incumbent Democrat George Graham has represented the 12th district since 2013.  He was defeated for re-election by Republican Chris Humphrey.

District 13
Incumbent Republican Pat McElraft has represented the 13th district since 2007.

District 14
Incumbent Republican George Cleveland has represented the 14th district since 2005.

District 15
Incumbent Republican Phil Shepard has represented the 15th district since 2011.

District 16
Incumbent Republican Bob Muller has represented the 16th district since 2017. Muller didn't seek re-election. Republican Carson Smith won the open seat.

District 17
Incumbent Republican Frank Iler has represented the 17th district since 2009.

District 18
Incumbent Democrat Deb Butler has represented the 18th district since 2017.

District 19
Incumbent Republican Ted Davis Jr. has represented the 19th district since 2012.

District 20
Incumbent Republican Holly Grange has represented the 20th district since 2016.

District 21
Incumbent Democrat Larry Bell has represented the 21st district and its predecessors since 2001. Bell didn't seek re-election and was succeeded by Raymond Smith.

District 22
Incumbent Republican William Brisson has represented the 22nd district since 2007. In 2017 Brisson switched from the Democratic Party to Republican Party.

District 23
Incumbent Democrat Shelly Willingham has represented the 23rd district since 2015.

District 24
Incumbent Democrat Jean Farmer-Butterfield has represented the 24th district since 2003.

District 25
Incumbent Republican Jeff Collins has represented the 25th district since 2011. He did not seek re-election. Democrat James Gailliard won the open seat.

District 26
Incumbent Republican Donna McDowell White has represented the 26th district since 2017.

District 27
Incumbent Democrat Michael Wray has represented the 27th district since 2005.

District 28
Incumbent Republican Larry Strickland has represented the 28th district since 2017.

District 29
Incumbent Democrat MaryAnn Black has represented the 29th district since 2017.

District 30
Incumbent Democrat Marcia Morey has represented the 30th district since 2017.

District 31
Incumbent Democrat Mickey Michaux has represented the 31st district and its predecessors since 1983. Michaux didn't seek re-election and was succeeded by Democrat Zack Forde-Hawkins.

District 32
Incumbent Democrat Terry Garrison has represented the 32nd district since 2017.

District 33
Incumbent Democrat Rosa Gill has represented the 33rd district since 2009.

District 34
Incumbent Democrat Grier Martin has represented the 34th district since 2013.

District 35
Incumbent Republican Chris Malone has represented the 35th district since 2013. Malone lost re-election to Democrat Terence Everitt.

District 36
Incumbent Republican Nelson Dollar has represented the 36th district since 2005. Dollar lost re-election to Democrat Julie von Haefen.

District 37
Incumbent Republican John Adcock has represented the 37th district since 2018. Adcock lost re-election to Democrat Sydney Batch

District 38
Incumbent Democrat Yvonne Lewis Holley has represented the 38th district since 2013.

District 39
Incumbent Democratic Minority Leader Darren Jackson has represented the 39th district since 2009.

District 40
Incumbent Democrat Joe John has represented the 40th district since 2017.

District 41
Incumbent Democrat Gale Adcock has represented the 41st district since 2015.

District 42
Incumbent Democrat Marvin Lucas has represented the 42nd district since 2001.

District 43
Incumbent Democrat Elmer Floyd has represented the 43rd district since 2009.

District 44
Incumbent Democrat William "Billy" Richardson has represented the 44th district since 2015.

District 45
Incumbent Republican John Szoka has represented the 45th district since 2013.

District 46
Incumbent Republican Brenden Jones has represented the 46th district since 2017.

District 47
Incumbent Democrat Charles Graham has represented the 47th district since 2011.

District 48
Incumbent Democrat Garland Pierce has represented the 48th district since 2005.

District 49
Incumbent Democrat Cynthia Ball has represented the 49th district since 2017.

District 50
Incumbent Democrat Graig Meyer has represented the 50th district since 2013.

District 51
Incumbent Republican John Sauls has represented the 51st district since 2017.

District 52
Incumbent Republican Jamie Boles has represented the 52nd district since 2009.

District 53
Incumbent Republican David Lewis has represented the 53rd district since 2003.

District 54
Incumbent Democrat Robert Reives II has represented the 54th district since 2014.

District 55
Incumbent Republican Mark Brody has represented the 55th district since 2013.

District 56
Incumbent Democrat Verla Insko has represented the 56th district since 1997.

District 57
The new 57th district is an open seat in Guilford County which is expected to favor Democrats. Ashton Clemmons won the open seat.

District 58
Incumbent Democrat Amos Quick has represented the 58th district since 2017.

District 59
Incumbent Republican Jon Hardister has represented the 59th district since 2013.

District 60
Incumbent Democrat Cecil Brockman has represented the 60th district since 2015.

District 61
The new 61st district overlaps with much of the former 57th district. Incumbent Democrat Pricey Harrison, who has represented the 57th district since 2005, successfully sought re-election here.

District 62
The new 62nd district includes the homes of Incumbent Republicans John Blust, who has represented the 62nd District since 2001, and John Faircloth, who has represented the 61st district since 2011. Blust retired while Faircloth successfully sought re-election here.

District 63
Incumbent Republican Stephen Ross has represented the 63rd District since 2013.

District 64
Incumbent Republican Dennis Riddell has represented the 64th District since 2013.

District 65
Incumbent Republican Bert Jones has represented the 65th District since 2011. Jones didn't seek re-election. Republican Jerry Carter was elected to succeed him.

District 66
Incumbent Democrat Ken Goodman has represented the 66th District since 2011.

District 67
Incumbent Republican Justin Burr has represented the 67th District since 2009. Burr lost the Republican Primary to Wayne Sasser. Sasser won the general election.

District 68
Incumbent Republican Craig Horn has represented the 68th District since 2011.

District 69
Incumbent Republican Dean Arp has represented the 69th District since 2013.

District 70
Incumbent Republican Pat Hurley has represented the 70th District since 2007.

District 71
Incumbent Democrat Evelyn Terry has represented the 71st District since 2013.

District 72
Incumbent Democrat Derwin Montgomery has represented the 72nd District since 2018.

District 73
Incumbent Republican Lee Zachary has represented the 73rd District since 2015.

District 74
Incumbent Republican Debra Conrad has represented the 74th District since 2013.

District 75
Incumbent Republican Donny Lambeth has represented the 75th District since 2013.

District 76
The new 76th district includes the homes of Incumbent Republicans Carl Ford, who has represented the 76th District since 2013, and Harry Warren who has represented the 77th district since 2011. Ford successfully sought election to NC Senate District 33 while Warren successfully sought re-election here.

District 77 
The new 77th district overlaps with much of the former 79th district. Incumbent Republican Julia Craven Howard, who has represented the 79th district and its predecessors since 1989, successfully sought re-election here.

District 78
Incumbent Republican Allen McNeill has represented the 78th District since 2012.

District 79
Following 2018 Redistricting, a new 79th district was created. The new district contains Beaufort and Craven counties and is expected to favor Republicans. Keith Kidwell won the open seat.

District 80
Incumbent Republican Sam Watford, who has represented the 80th District since 2015, ran for the NC Senate. He was succeeded by Republican Steve Jarvis

District 81
Incumbent Republican Larry Potts has represented the 81st District since 2017.

District 82
The new 82nd district overlaps with much of the former 83rd district. Incumbent Republican Linda Johnson, who has represented the 83rd district and its predecessors since 2001, was re-elected here.

District 83
The new 83rd district overlaps with much of the former 82nd district. Incumbent Republican Larry Pittman, who has represented the 82nd district since 2011, was re-elected here.

District 84
Incumbent Republican Rena Turner has represented the 84th District since 2013.

District 85
Incumbent Republican Josh Dobson has represented the 85th District since 2013.

District 86
Incumbent Republican Hugh Blackwell has represented the 86th District since 2009.

District 87
Incumbent Republican Destin Hall has represented the 87th District since 2017.

District 88
Incumbent Democrat Mary Belk has represented the 88th District since 2017.

District 89
Incumbent Republican Mitchell Setzer has represented the 89th District and its predecessors since 1999.

District 90
Incumbent Republican Sarah Stevens  has represented the 90th District since 2009.

District 91
Incumbent Republican Kyle Hall has represented the 91st District since 2015.

District 92
Incumbent Democrat Chaz Beasley has represented the 92nd District since 2017.

District 93
Incumbent Republican Jonathan Jordan has represented the 93rd District since 2011. Jordan was defeated for re-election by Democrat Carl Ray Russell.

District 94
Incumbent Republican Jeffrey Elmore has represented the 94th District since 2013.

District 95
Incumbent Republican John Fraley has represented the 95th District since 2015.

District 96
Incumbent Republican Jay Adams has represented the 96th District since 2015.

District 97
Incumbent Republican Jason Saine has represented the 97th District since 2011.

District 98
Incumbent Republican John Bradford has represented the 98th District since 2015. Bradford was defeated for re-election by Democrat Christy Clark

District 99
Incumbent Democrat Rodney Moore has represented the 99th District since 2011. Moore lost re-nomination to fellow Democrat Nasif Majeed. Majeed won the general election.

District 100
Incumbent Democrat John Autry has represented the 100th District since 2017.

District 101
Incumbent Democrat Beverly Earle has represented the 101st District and its predecessors since 1995. Earl didn't seek re-election. Democrat Carolyn Logan won the open seat.

District 102
Incumbent Democrat Becky Carney has represented the 102nd District since 2003.

District 103
Incumbent Republican Bill Brawley has represented the 103rd District since 2011. Brawley lost re-election to Democrat Rachel Hunt.

District 104
Incumbent Republican Andy Dulin has represented the 104th District since 2017. Dulin lost re-election to Democrat Brandon Lofton.

District 105
Incumbent Republican Scott Stone has represented the 105th District since 2016. Stone lost re-election by Democrat Wesley Harris.

District 106
Incumbent Democrat Carla Cunningham has represented the 106th District since 2013.

District 107
Incumbent Democrat Kelly Alexander has represented the 107th District since 2009.

District 108
Incumbent Republican John Torbett has represented the 108th District since 2011.

District 109
Incumbent Republican Dana Bumgardner has represented the 109th District since 2013.

District 110
Incumbent Republican Kelly Hastings has represented the 110th District since 2011.

District 111
Incumbent Republican Speaker of the House Tim Moore has represented the 111th District since 2003.

District 112
Incumbent Republican David Rogers has represented the 112th District since 2016.

District 113
Incumbent Republican Cody Henson has represented the 113th District since 2017.

District 114
Incumbent Democrat Susan Fisher has represented the 114th District since 2004.

District 115
Incumbent Democrat John Ager has represented the 115th District since 2015.

District 116
Incumbent Democrat Brian Turner has represented the 116th District since 2015.

District 117
Incumbent Republican Chuck McGrady has represented the 117th District since 2011.

District 118
Incumbent Republican Michele Presnell has represented the 118th District since 2013.

District 119
Incumbent Republican Mike Clampitt has represented the 119th District since 2017. In a rematch of the 2016 election, Clampitt was defeated by Democrat Joe Sam Queen

District 120
Incumbent Republican Kevin Corbin has represented the 120th District since 2017.

Notes

References

North Carolina House of Representatives
House of Representatives
2018